Al Hussein or al-Husayn (Arabic: الحسين) is the designation of an Iraqi short-range ballistic missile. The missile was the result of upgrading the Soviet made Scud in order to achieve a longer range. The weapon was widely used by the Iraqi Army during the Iran–Iraq War and the Gulf War of 1991.

Development
The origins of the Al-Hussein could be traced back to the first stages of the war with Iran. Iraq was the first belligerent to use long range artillery rockets during the Iran–Iraq War, firing limited numbers of FROG-7s at the towns of Dezful and Ahvaz. Iran responded with Scud-Bs obtained from Libya. These missiles can hit a target 185 miles away, therefore key Iraqi cities like Sulaymaniya, Kirkuk, and Baghdad itself came within the range of this weapon.

Iraq, which also deployed the Scud-B, was conversely unable to strike the main Iranian industrial centers, including the capital, Tehran, because these are located more than 300 miles from the border. To surmount the Iranian advantage, Iraqi engineers designed a program to upgrade the original Scuds into a series of ballistic missiles whose range would surpass 500 miles. The assembly facility was located near Taji.

The first development, called Al-Hussein, with a range of 400 miles, allowed the Iraqi army to attack deep inside the Iranian boundaries. The Iraqis had initiated project 1728 for indigenous Scud engine development and production.  The range was extended by reducing the original 945 kg warhead to 500 kg and increasing the propellant capacity. The warhead carried HE, although it had chemical, biological and nuclear capabilities. According to UN inspectors reports, the Iraqis were able to produce all the major components of the system by 1991. The Al-Hussein was 12.46 meters long and had a diameter of 0.88 meters. The guidance was inertial, without terminal phase. The altitude where the motor burnt out was 31 miles, while the trajectory highest altitude or apogee, was 94 miles. The accuracy for the impact, or Circular error probable, was estimated in a radius of 1,000 meters, and the missile launch weight was 6,400 kg.

Its flight time was of about eight minutes for the maximum range.

The missile fuel was common to every tactical missile of the Cold War: a mix of kerosene, ignited by a nitric acid oxidizer, called IRFNA. Each missile loaded 4,500 kg of liquid propellant, composed by a 22% of kerosene and 78% of IRFNA.

The Iraqis also extended the launch rail of 11 Soviet-produced MAZ-543 artillery trucks to fit them for the longer local-built missiles. The unit responsible for the maintenance and operation of the new missiles was initially the 224 Brigade, already established since 1976 to deal with the R-17 Scuds imported from the Soviet Union in 1972.

By 1989, a second army Brigade was formed, the 223, equipped with 4 locally developed trailer launchers, known as the Al-Nida, which included azimuth identification systems (AzID) for targeting. There were also a second indigenous launcher, the Al-Waleed, but it apparently never became operational.

Some concrete silos were built west of Ar Rutba, near the border with Jordan. They were destroyed by precision bombings carried out by USAF F-15s during the first hours of Operation Desert Storm.

Operational history

Iran–Iraq War (1980–1988)
Up to 200 missiles were launched against Iran between 1987 and 1988, killing some 2,000 people. Tehran, Qom and Isfahan became the usual targets. Their poor accuracy, while mostly ineffective to conduct a major strategic campaign, made them basically weapons of terror, forcing thousands of refugees out of the main Iranian cities. This exchange of ballistic missiles was indeed known as 'the war of the cities'. The full-scale campaign lasted from 29 February 1988 until April 20, when a truce was agreed by both sides. Iraq, which had been looking for some kind of compromise gesture from Iran, is largely viewed as the 'winner' by some sources.

According to Iranian sources, the fuselage and warhead were prone to break into fragments while re-entering the atmosphere. This phenomenon later was an advantage as a counter-measure against the Patriot missile during the 1991 Persian Gulf War.

Persian Gulf War (1991)
Eighty-eight of these modified Scuds were fired at Saudi Arabia (46) and Israel (42) during January and February 1991.

The greatest tactical achievement of the Al-Hussein was the destruction of a US military barracks in Dhahran, Saudi Arabia, on 25 February 1991, at 8:30 p.m. local time, when 28 soldiers were killed and other 110 injured, mainly reservists from Pennsylvania.

One of the units involved in this incident, the 14th Quartermaster Detachment, specializing in water-purification, suffered the heaviest toll among US troops deployed in the Persian Gulf, with 81% of its soldiers killed or wounded.

The failure of the Patriot system in tracking the Iraqi missile over Dhahran was provoked by a shift in the range gate of the radar, due to the continuous use of the software for more than 100 hours without resetting.

Only 10 of the 46 Al-Hussein launched at Saudi Arabia caused significant damage: two strikes on US military bases (including the army barracks at Dhahran), one on a Saudi government building, and the remaining seven on civilian facilities. The following is a detailed list of these attacks:

 Attacks assessment

Besides the American soldiers, Saudi authorities reported one security guard killed and about 70 civilians injured as result of the missile strikes.

Thirty-eight of the 42 missiles aimed at Israel landed within the boundaries of that country; the other four fell on the West Bank area. Although thousands of houses and apartments were damaged by the strikes, only two people died directly as consequence of the impacts. Another 12 lost their life from indirect causes (suffocation while wearing gas-masks and heart attacks).

The threat posed by the Al-Hussein and other Scud missiles forced the coalition air forces to divert 40% of their missions to hunt the launchers along with their support vehicles and supplies. The ground war was postponed one week for this reason.

End of the program
Under the terms of the ceasefire of March 1991, corroborated by the resolution 687 of the UN Security Council, a commission (UNSCOM) was established to assure the dismantling of the Iraqi missile program. They were only allowed to purchase or produce missiles with a range no longer than 150 km.  At the end of the war, the Iraqi government declared it had only 61 Al-Hussein and other ballistic missiles in its arsenal. These weapons were destroyed under UNSCOM supervision. This process was completed by July 1991. However, the western powers were suspicious that the Iraqi army may have hidden as many as 200 missiles. The Iraqis took advantage of the provisions of the ceasefire by developing two types of short-range ballistic missiles, the Ababil-100 (also called al Fat'h) and the Al-Samoud, which were in an experimental phase at the time of the Invasion of Iraq in 2003. These projects were part of the casus belli raised by the American administration against Saddam Hussein.

See also

Related articles
 List of missiles

Iraqi missiles derived from Al-Hussein missile
 Al Abbas
 Al Hijarah

References

Bibliography
 Zaloga, Steven, Ray, Lee, Laurier, Jim: Scud Ballistic Missile and Launch Systems 1955–2005, New Vanguard, 2005.
 Scales, Brigadier General Robert H. Jr: Certain Victory. Brassey's, 1994.
 Lowry, Richard S.: The Gulf War Chronicles: A Military History of the First War with Iraq. iUniverse, inc., 2003.

Military history of Iraq
Tactical ballistic missiles of Iraq
Iraq–Israel relations
Iraq–Saudi Arabia relations
Chemical weapon delivery systems
Short-range ballistic missiles of Iraq
Weapons and ammunition introduced in 1987
Theatre ballistic missiles